Mount Damfool is a mountain in the Southern Alps of New Zealand. It is a grade 1+ climb that can be completed in a long day from the Bealey Bridge via the Anti Crow River valley.

References

See also
List of mountains of New Zealand by height

Damfool
Southern Alps